Papilio is a genus in the swallowtail butterfly family, Papilionidae, as well as the only representative of the tribe Papilionini. The word papilio is Latin for butterfly.

It includes the common yellow swallowtail (Papilio machaon), which is widespread in the Northern Hemisphere and the type species of the genus, as well as a number of other well-known North American species such as the western tiger swallowtail (Papilio rutulus). Familiar species elsewhere in the world include the Mormons (Papilio polytes, Papilio polymnestor, Papilio memnon, and Papilio deiphobus) in Asia, the orchard and Ulysses swallowtails in Australia (Papilio aegeus, Papilio ulysses, respectively) and the citrus swallowtail of Africa (Papilio demodocus).

Older classifications of the swallowtails tended to use many rather small genera. More recent classifications have been more conservative, and as a result a number of former genera are now absorbed within Papilio, such as Achillides, Eleppone, Druryia, Heraclides (giant swallowtails), Menelaides, Princeps, Pterourus (tiger swallowtails), and Sinoprinceps. The genus as recognized by modern systems has about 200 members. The genus Chilasa is regarded as a subgenus of Papilio by some workers, as are the baggy-tailed swallowtails (Agehana), although the latter taxon is usually considered a subgenus of Chilasa.

Many of the larvae resemble bird droppings during a development stage. Adults are edible to birds and some species are mimics.

Ecology
In their larval form, members of Papilio typically feed upon plants of Rutaceae including common ornamental and agriculturally important species such as Citrus species, Murraya species, Choisya species and Calodendrum species. Caterpillars sequester terpenoids from their diet to produce a foul smelling oil used in defence.

Species
Listed alphabetically within groups.
subgenus: Papilio Linnaeus, 1758
species group: machaon

 Papilio alexanor Esper, 1800 – southern swallowtail
 Papilio brevicauda Saunders, 1869 – short-tailed swallowtail
 Papilio hospiton Géné, 1839 – Corsican swallowtail
 Papilio indra Reakirt, 1866 – Indra swallowtail, short-tailed black swallowtail, or cliff swallowtail
 Papilio joanae J. Heitzman, 1973 – Ozark swallowtail
 Papilio machaon Linnaeus, 1758 – Old World swallowtail, common yellow swallowtail, or artemisia swallowtail
 Papilio polyxenes Fabricius, 1775 – black swallowtail, eastern black swallowtail, American swallowtail, or parsnip swallowtail
 Papilio saharae Oberthür, 1879 – Sahara swallowtail
 Papilio zelicaon Lucas, 1852 – anise swallowtail or western swallowtail

subgenus: Princeps Hübner, [1807]
species group: antimachus
 Papilio antimachus Drury, 1782 – Antimachus swallowtail or giant African swallowtail

species group: zalmoxis
 Papilio zalmoxis Hewitson, 1864 – giant blue swallowtail

species group: nireus

 Papilio aristophontes Oberthür, 1897
 Papilio charopus Westwood, 1843 – tailed green-banded swallowtail
 Papilio chrapkowskii Suffert, 1904 – broad green-banded swallowtail or Chrapkowski's green-banded swallowtail
 Papilio chrapkowskoides Storace, 1952 – broadly green-banded swallowtail
 Papilio desmondi van Someren, 1939 – Desmond's green-banded swallowtail
 Papilio hornimani Distant, 1879 – Horniman's green-banded swallowtail or Horniman's swallowtail
 Papilio interjectana Vane-Wright, 1995 – Van Someren's green-banded swallowtail
 Papilio nireus Linnaeus, 1758 – green-banded swallowtail, narrow-banded green swallowtail, or African blue-banded swallowtail
 Papilio sosia Rothschild & Jordan, 1903 – medium green-banded swallowtail
 Papilio thuraui Karsch, 1900
 Papilio ufipa Carcasson, 1961
 Papilio wilsoni Rothschild, 1926

species group: cynorta
 Papilio arnoldiana Vane-Wright, 1995
 Papilio cynorta Fabricius, 1793 – mimetic swallowtail
 Papilio plagiatus Aurivillius, 1898 – mountain mimetic swallowtail

species group: dardanus

 Papilio constantinus Ward, 1871 – Constantine's swallowtail
 Papilio dardanus Brown, 1776 – mocker swallowtail, flying handkerchief, or African swallowtail
 Papilio delalandei Godart, [1824]
 Papilio phorcas Cramer, [1775] – apple-green swallowtail or green banded swallowtail
 Papilio rex Oberthür, 1886 – regal swallowtail

species group: zenobia
 Papilio cyproeofila Butler, 1868 – common white-banded swallowtail
 Papilio fernandus Fruhstorfer, 1903
 Papilio filaprae Suffert, 1904
 Papilio gallienus Distant, 1879 – narrow-banded swallowtail
 Papilio mechowi Dewitz, 1881
 Papilio mechowianus Dewitz, 1885
 Papilio nobicea Suffert, 1904 – Volta swallowtail
 Papilio zenobia Fabricius, 1775 – Zenobia swallowtail

species group: demodocus

 Papilio demodocus Esper, 1799 – citrus swallowtail, citrus butterfly, orange dog, or Christmas butterfly
 Papilio demoleus Linnaeus, 1758 – (common) lime swallowtail or lime butterfly
 Papilio erithonioides Grose-Smith, 1891
 Papilio grosesmithi Rothschild, 1926
 Papilio morondavana Grose-Smith, 1891 – Madagascan emperor

species group: echerioides
 Papilio echerioides Trimen, 1868 – white-banded swallowtail
 Papilio fuelleborni Karsch, 1900
 Papilio jacksoni Sharpe, 1891 – Jackson's swallowtail
 Papilio sjoestedti Aurivillius, 1908 – Kilimanjaro swallowtail

species group: oribazus

 Papilio epiphorbas Boisduval, 1833
 Papilio nobilis Rogenhofer, 1891 – noble swallowtail
 Papilio oribazus Boisduval, 1836

species group: hesperus
 Papilio euphranor Trimen, 1868 – forest swallowtail or bush kite
 Papilio hesperus Westwood, 1843 – emperor swallowtail
 Papilio horribilis Butler, 1874
 Papilio pelodurus Butler, 1896

species group: menestheus

 Papilio lormieri Distant, 1874 – central emperor swallowtail
 Papilio menestheus Drury, 1773 – western emperor swallowtail
 Papilio ophidicephalus Oberthür, 1878 – emperor swallowtail

species group: incertae sedis

 Papilio andronicus Ward, 1871
 Papilio chitondensis Bivar de Sousa & Fernandes, 1966
 Papilio leucotaenia Rothschild, 1908 – cream-banded swallowtail
 Papilio luzviae Schröder & Treadaway, 1991
 Papilio mackinnoni Sharpe, 1891 – MacKinnon's swallowtail
 Papilio mangoura Hewitson, 1875 – Mangoura swallowtail
 Papilio manlius Fabricius, 1798
 Papilio microps Storace, 1951
 Papilio nobicea Berger, 1974
 Papilio phorbanta Linnaeus, 1771 – papillon la pature

species group: noblei
 Papilio antonio Hewitson, [1875]
 Papilio noblei de Nicéville, [1889]

species group: demolion
 Papilio demolion Cramer, [1776] – banded swallowtail
 Papilio euchenor Guérin-Méneville, 1829
 Papilio gigon C. Felder & R. Felder, 1864
 Papilio liomedon Moore, [1875] – Malabar banded swallowtail

species group: anactus
Papilio anactus MacLeay, [1826] – dingy swallowtail
Papilio natewa  – Natewa swallowtail

species group: aegeus
 Papilio aegeus Donovan, 1805 – orchard swallowtail
 Papilio bridgei Mathew, 1886
 Papilio erskinei Mathew, 1886
 Papilio gambrisius Cramer, [1777]
 Papilio inopinatus Butler, 1883
 Papilio ptolychus Godman & Salvin, 1888
 Papilio tydeus C. Felder & R. Felder, 1860
 Papilio weymeri Niepelt, 1914
 Papilio woodfordi Godman & Salvin, 1888 – Woodford's swallowtail

species group: godeffroyi
 Papilio amynthor Boisduval, 1859 – Norfolk swallowtail
 Papilio godeffroyi Semper, 1866 – Godeffroy's swallowtail
 Papilio schmeltzi Herrich-Schäffer, 1869

species group: polytes

 Papilio ambrax Boisduval, 1832 – Ambrax butterfly
 Papilio phestus Guérin-Méneville, 1830
 Papilio polytes Linnaeus, 1758 – common Mormon

species group: castor
 Papilio castor Westwood, 1842 – common raven
 Papilio dravidarum Wood-Mason, 1880 – Malabar raven
 Papilio mahadeva Moore, [1879] – Burmese raven

species group: fuscus
 Papilio albinus Wallace, 1865
 Papilio diophantus Grose-Smith, 1883
 Papilio fuscus Goeze, 1779 – Canopus butterfly
 Papilio hipponous C. Felder & R. Felder, 1862
 Papilio jordani Fruhstorfer, 1906 – Jordan's swallowtail
 Papilio pitmani Elwes & de Nicéville, [1887]
 Papilio prexaspes C. Felder & R. Felder, 1865 – Andaman Helen
 Papilio sakontala Hewitson, 1864

species group: helenus
 Papilio helenus Linnaeus, 1758 – red Helen
 Papilio iswara White, 1842 – great Helen
 Papilio iswaroides Fruhstorfer, 1898
 Papilio nephelus Boisduval, 1836 – yellow Helen
 Papilio nubilus Staudinger, 1895
 Papilio sataspes C. Felder & R. Felder, 1865

species group: memnon

 Papilio acheron Grose-Smith, 1887 – Acheron swallowtail
 Papilio ascalaphus Boisduval, 1836 – Ascalaphus swallowtail
 Papilio deiphobus Linnaeus, 1758
 Papilio forbesi Grose-Smith, 1883
 Papilio lampsacus Boisduval, 1836
 Papilio lowi H. Druce, 1873 – Asian swallowtail or great yellow Mormon
 Papilio mayo Atkinson, 1873 – Andaman Mormon
 Papilio memnon Linnaeus, 1758 – great Mormon
 Papilio oenomaus Godart, 1819
 Papilio polymnestor Cramer, [1775] – blue Mormon
 Papilio rumanzovia Eschscholtz, 1821 – scarlet Mormon or red Mormon

species group: protenor
 Papilio alcmenor C. Felder & R. Felder, [1864] – redbreast
 Papilio macilentus Janson, 1877
 Papilio protenor – spangle
 Papilio taiwanus Rothschild, 1898 – Formosan swallowtail

species group: bootes
 Papilio bootes Westwood, 1842 – tailed redbreast
 Papilio elwesi Leech, 1889
 Papilio maraho Shiraki & Sonan, 1934

subgenus: Chilasa Moore, [1881]
species group: agestor
 Papilio agestor Gray, 1831 – tawny mime
 Papilio epycides Hewitson, [1864] – lesser mime
 Papilio slateri Hewitson, 1853 – blue-striped mime

species group: clytia
 Papilio clytia Linnaeus, 1758 – common mime
 Papilio paradoxa (Zincken, 1831) – great mime

species group: veiovis
 Papilio veiovis Hewitson, [1865]

species group: laglaizei
 Papilio laglaizei Depuiset, 1877
 Papilio moerneri Aurivillius, 1919
 Papilio toboroi Ribbe, 1907

species group: unnamed
 Papilio carolinensis Jumalon, 1967
 Papilio osmana Jumalon, 1967

subgenus: Achillides Hübner, [1819]
species group: paris
 Papilio arcturus Westwood, 1842 – blue peacock
 Papilio bianor Cramer, [1777] – Chinese peacock
 Papilio chikae Igarashi, 1965 – Luzon peacock swallowtail
 Papilio dialis Leech, 1893 – southern Chinese peacock
 Papilio doddsi Janet, 1896
 Papilio elephenor Doubleday, 1845 – yellow-crested spangle
 Papilio hoppo Matsumura, 1908
 Papilio karna C. Felder & R. Felder, 1864
 Papilio krishna Moore, 1857 – Krishna peacock
 Papilio longimacula Z.G. Wang & Y. Niu, 2002
 Papilio maackii Ménétriés, 1859 – alpine black swallowtail
 Papilio paris Linnaeus, 1758 – Paris peacock
 Papilio polyctor Boisduval, 1836 – common peacock

species group: palinurus
 Papilio blumei Boisduval, 1836 – peacock or green swallowtail
 Papilio buddha Westwood, 1872 – Malabar banded peacock
 Papilio crino Fabricius, 1793 – common banded peacock
 Papilio palinurus Fabricius, 1787 – emerald swallowtail

species group: unnamed
 Papilio lorquinianus C. Felder & R. Felder, 1865
 Papilio neumoegeni Honrath, 1890
 Papilio peranthus Fabricius, 1787
 Papilio pericles Wallace, 1865

species group: ulysses
 Papilio montrouzieri Boisduval, 1859
 Papilio syfanius Oberthür, 1886
 Papilio ulysses Linnaeus, 1758 – Ulysses, mountain blue, blue emperor, or blue mountain swallowtail

subgenus: Heraclides Hübner, [1819]
species group: anchisiades

 Papilio anchisiades Esper, 1788 – ruby-spotted swallowtail or red-spotted swallowtail
 Papilio chiansiades Westwood, 1872
 Papilio epenetus Hewitson, 1861
 Papilio erostratus Westwood, 1847 – Erostratus swallowtail
 Papilio hyppason Cramer, 1775
 Papilio isidorus Doubleday, 1846
 Papilio oxynius (Geyer, [1827])
 Papilio pelaus Fabricius, 1775
 Papilio rogeri Boisduval, 1836

species group: thoas

 Papilio andraemon (Hübner, [1823]) – Bahaman swallowtail
 Papilio androgeus Cramer, [1775] – Androgeus swallowtail, queen page, or queen swallowtail
 Papilio aristodemus Esper, 1794 – Schaus' swallowtail or island swallowtail
 Papilio aristor Godart, 1819 – scarce Haitian swallowtail
 Papilio astyalus Godart, 1819 – broad-banded swallowtail or Astyalus swallowtail
 Papilio caiguanabus Poey, [1852] – Poey's black swallowtail
 Papilio cresphontes Cramer, [1777] – giant swallowtail
 Papilio homothoas Rothschild & Jordan, 1906
 Papilio machaonides Esper, 1796
 Papilio melonius Rothschild & Jordan, 1906
 Papilio ornythion Boisduval, 1836 – Ornythion swallowtail
 Papilio paeon Boisduval, 1836
 Papilio rumiko (Shiraiwa & Grishin, 2014)
 Papilio thersites Fabricius, 1775 – Thersites swallowtail or false Androgeus swallowtail
 Papilio thoas Linnaeus, 1771 – Thoas swallowtail or king swallowtail

species group: torquatus
 Papilio garleppi Staudinger, 1892 – Garlepp's swallowtail
 Papilio hectorides Esper, 1794
 Papilio himeros Hopffer, 1865 – Himeros swallowtail
 Papilio lamarchei Staudinger, 1892
 Papilio torquatus Cramer, 1777 – Torquatus swallowtail

species group: unnamed
 Papilio okinawensis Fruhstorfer, 1898

subgenus: Pterourus Scopoli, 1777
species group: troilus

 Papilio palamedes Drury, [1773] – Palamedes swallowtail or laurel swallowtail
 Papilio troilus Linnaeus, 1758 – spicebush swallowtail

species group: glaucus

 Papilio alexiares Höpffer, 1866 – Mexican tiger swallowtail
 Papilio appalachiensis (Pavulaan & Wright, 2002) – Appalachian tiger swallowtail
 Papilio canadensis Rothschild & Jordan, 1906 – Canadian tiger swallowtail
 Papilio esperanza Beutelspacher, 1975 – Esperanza swallowtail
 Papilio eurymedon Lucas, 1852 – pale swallowtail or pallid tiger swallowtail
 Papilio glaucus Linnaeus, 1758 – eastern tiger swallowtail
 Papilio multicaudata Kirby, 1884 – two-tailed swallowtail
 Papilio pilumnus Boisduval, 1836 – three-tailed tiger swallowtail
 Papilio rutulus Lucas, 1852 – western tiger swallowtail

species group: zagreus
 Papilio bachus C. Felder & R. Felder, 1865
 Papilio neyi Niepelt, 1909
 Papilio zagreus Doubleday, 1847

species group: scamander
 Papilio birchallii Hewitson, 1863
 Papilio hellanichus Hewitson, 1868
 Papilio scamander Boisduval, 1836
 Papilio xanthopleura Godman & Salvin, 1868

species group: homerus
 Papilio cacicus Lucas, 1852
 Papilio euterpinus Salvin & Godman, 1868
 Papilio garamas (Geyer, [1829])
 Papilio homerus Fabricius, 1793 – Homerus swallowtail
 Papilio judicael Oberthür, 1888 (tentatively placed here, may be hybrid)
 Papilio menatius (Hübner, [1819])
 Papilio warscewiczii Hopffer, 1865

subgenus: Sinoprinceps Hancock, 1983
 Papilio benguetanus Joicey & Talbot, 1923

species group: xuthus Hancock, 1983
 Papilio xuthus Linnaeus, 1767 – Asian, Xuthus, or Chinese yellow swallowtail

Former species
Many species originally described in the genus Papilio have now been reclassified. For a list of selected former species see List of former species in the genus Papilio.

References

External links

 Canadian Biodiversity Information Facility —P
 "Genus Papilio". Insecta.pro.
 GART checklist 

 
Butterfly genera
Papilionidae
Taxa named by Carl Linnaeus